The 2021–22 New York Rangers season was the franchise's 95th season of play and their 96th season overall. Before the season, the Rangers lost Colin Blackwell to the Seattle Kraken in the 2021 NHL Expansion Draft.

The Rangers retired the no. 30 jersey in honor of Henrik Lundqvist on January 28, 2022.

During the season the team commemorated Rod Gilbert, who died in August 2021, with a no. 7 shoulder patch on their jerseys. Additionally, the Rangers created the Rod Gilbert "Mr. Ranger" Award, which will be given annually to the player "who best honors Rod's legacy by exemplifying leadership qualities both on and off the ice, and making a significant humanitarian contribution to his community."

On December 3, 2021, after a 1–0 win over the San Jose Sharks, Rangers goaltenders Igor Shesterkin and Alexandar Georgiev had a first combined shutout since Henrik Lundqvist and Antti Raanta achieved it during a 2–0 victory over the Dallas Stars on December 15, 2016.

Three Rangers were selected to participate in the 2022 NHL All-Star Game: Chris Kreider, Adam Fox, and Mika Zibanejad. However, due to personal reasons, Zibanejad did not attend the game. It was the 34th time in franchise history that the Rangers have had three or more players selected to the same All-Star Game and first since the 2011–12 season with Henrik Lundqvist, Daniel Girardi and Marian Gaborik. At the conclusion of the regular season, Shesterkin was nominated for and eventually won the Vezina Trophy, and was also named to the NHL first All-Star team.

On April 9, 2022, the Rangers clinched a playoff berth after a 5–1 win against the Ottawa Senators. In the First Round of the 2022 Stanley Cup playoffs, the Rangers trailed 3–1 after the first four games of the series, but won the next three games against the Pittsburgh Penguins and won the series 4–3. This was the third time in franchise history that the Rangers won the seven-game series after trailing 3–1 (2013–14 and 2014–15). The Rangers qualified for the Conference Finals for the first time since the 2014–15 season after they defeated the Carolina Hurricanes in seven games in the Second Round. They would go on to lose to the Tampa Bay Lightning in six games.

Standings

Divisional standings

Conference standings

Schedule and results

Preseason
The preseason schedule was published on July 27, 2021.

|- style="background:#fcc;"
| 1 || September 26 || NY Islanders || 0–4 || || Georgiev || Madison Square Garden || 10,238 || 0–1–0 || 
|- style="background:#cfc;"
| 2 || September 28 || Boston || 3–2 || || Wall || Madison Square Garden || 9,902 || 1–1–0 || 
|- style="background:#fcc;"
| 3 || October 1 || @ New Jersey || 1–7 || || Shesterkin || Prudential Center || 10,474 || 1–2–0 || 
|- style="background:#cfc;"
| 4 || October 2 || @ Boston || 4–3 || OT || Wall || TD Garden || 17,850 || 2–2–0 || 
|- style="background:#cfc;"
| 5 || October 6 || New Jersey || 6–2 || || Shesterkin || Madison Square Garden || 10,468 || 3–2–0 || 
|- style="background:#cfc;"
| 6 || October 9 || @ NY Islanders || 5–4 || OT || Georgiev || Webster Bank Arena || — || 4–2–0 || 
|-

Regular season
The regular season schedule was published on July 22, 2021, with only about a handful of games scheduled in February because NHL players were planning to participate in the 2022 Winter Olympics. However, on December 22, the NHL announced that its players would not participate in the 2022 Winter Olympics due to the ongoing COVID-19 pandemic.

|- style="background:#fcc;"
| 1 || October 13 || @ Washington || 1–5 || || Georgiev || Capital One Arena || 18,573 || 0–1–0 || 0 || 
|- style="background:#fff;"
| 2 || October 14 || Dallas || 2–3 || OT || Shesterkin || Madison Square Garden || 17,173 || 0–1–1 || 1 || 
|- style="background:#cfc;"
| 3 || October 16 || @ Montreal || 3–1 || || Shesterkin || Bell Centre || 21,105 || 1–1–1 || 3 || 
|- style="background:#cfc;"
| 4 || October 18 || @ Toronto || 2–1 || OT || Shesterkin || Scotiabank Arena || 18,098 || 2–1–1 || 5 || 
|- style="background:#cfc;"
| 5 || October 21 || @ Nashville || 3–1 || || Shesterkin || Bridgestone Arena || 17,159 || 3–1–1 || 7 || 
|- style="background:#cfc;"
| 6 || October 23 || @ Ottawa || 3–2 || || Georgiev || Canadian Tire Centre || 11,167 || 4–1–1 || 9 || 
|- style="background:#fcc;"
| 7 || October 25 || Calgary || 1–5 || || Shesterkin || Madison Square Garden || 13,590 || 4–2–1 || 9 || 
|- style="background:#cfc;"
| 8 || October 29 || Columbus || 4–0 || || Shesterkin || Madison Square Garden || 14,532 || 5–2–1 || 11 || 
|- style="background:#cfc;"
| 9 || October 31 || @ Seattle || 3–1 || || Shesterkin || Climate Pledge Arena || 17,151 || 6–2–1 || 13 || 
|-

|- style="background:#fff;"
| 10 || November 2 || @ Vancouver || 2–3 || OT || Shesterkin || Rogers Arena || 18,257 || 6–2–2 || 14 || 
|- style="background:#fff;"
| 11 || November 5 || @ Edmonton || 5–6 || OT || Georgiev || Rogers Place || 17,404 || 6–2–3 || 15 || 
|- style="background:#fcc;"
| 12 || November 6 || @ Calgary || 0–6 || || Shesterkin || Scotiabank Saddledome || 15,879 || 6–3–3 || 15 || 
|- style="background:#cfc;"
| 13 || November 8 || Florida || 4–3 || || Shesterkin || Madison Square Garden || 14,877 || 7–3–3 || 17 || 
|- style="background:#cfc;"
| 14 || November 13 || @ Columbus || 5–3 || || Shesterkin || Nationwide Arena || 15,539 || 8–3–3 || 19 || 
|- style="background:#cfc;"
| 15 || November 14 || New Jersey || 4–3 || SO || Georgiev || Madison Square Garden || 16,130 || 9–3–3 || 21 || 
|- style="background:#cfc;"
| 16 || November 16 || Montreal || 3–2 || || Shesterkin || Madison Square Garden || 15,255 || 10–3–3 || 23 || 
|- style="background:#fcc;"
| 17 || November 18 || @ Toronto || 1–2 || || Shesterkin || Scotiabank Arena || 19,029 || 10–4–3 || 23 || 
|- style="background:#ccc;"
| — || November 20 || @ Ottawa || – || colspan="7"|Postponed due to COVID-19 protocol; moved to February 20
|- style="background:#cfc;"
| 18 || November 21 || Buffalo || 5–4 || || Shesterkin || Madison Square Garden || 17,256 || 11–4–3 || 25 || 
|- style="background:#cfc;"
| 19 || November 24 || @ NY Islanders || 4–1 || || Shesterkin || UBS Arena || 17,255 || 12–4–3 || 27 || 
|- style="background:#cfc;"
| 20 || November 26 || @ Boston || 5–2 || || Shesterkin || TD Garden || 17,850 || 13–4–3 || 29 || 
|- style="background:#ccc;"
| — || November 28 || NY Islanders || – || colspan="7"|Postponed due to COVID-19 protocol; moved to March 17
|-

|- style="background:#cfc;"
| 21 || December 1 || Philadelphia || 4–1 || || Shesterkin || Madison Square Garden || 15,687 || 14–4–3 || 31 || 
|- style="background:#cfc;"
| 22 || December 3 || San Jose || 1–0 || || Shesterkin || Madison Square Garden || 16,726 || 15–4–3 || 33 || 
|- style="background:#cfc;"
| 23 || December 4 || Chicago || 3–2 || || Georgiev || Madison Square Garden || 17,046 || 16–4–3 || 35 || 
|- style="background:#cfc;"
| 24 || December 7 || @ Chicago || 6–2 || || Georgiev || United Center || 17,207 || 17–4–3 || 37 || 
|- style="background:#fcc;"
| 25 || December 8 || Colorado || 3–7 || || Huska || Madison Square Garden || 16,714 || 17–5–3 || 37 || 
|- style="background:#cfc;"
| 26 || December 10 || @ Buffalo || 2–1 || || Georgiev || KeyBank Center || 9,703 || 18–5–3 || 39 || 
|- style="background:#fcc;"
| 27 || December 12 || Nashville || 0–1 || || Georgiev || Madison Square Garden || 16,177 || 18–6–3 || 39 || 
|- style="background:#fcc;"
| 28 || December 14 || @ Colorado || 2–4 || || Georgiev || Ball Arena || 17,198 || 18–7–3 || 39 || 
|- style="background:#cfc;"
| 29 || December 15 || @ Arizona || 3–2 || || Kinkaid || Gila River Arena || 11,380 || 19–7–3 || 41 || 
|- style="background:#fff;"
| 30 || December 17 || Vegas || 2–3 || SO || Georgiev || Madison Square Garden || 17,400 || 19–7–4 || 42 || 
|- style="background:#ccc;"
| — || December 22 || Montreal || – || colspan="7"|Postponed due to COVID-19 protocol; moved to April 27
|- style="background:#ccc;"
| — || December 27 || Detroit || – || colspan="7"|Postponed due to COVID-19 protocol; moved to February 17
|- style="background:#fcc;"
| 31 || December 29 || @ Florida || 3–4 || || Shesterkin || FLA Live Arena || 15,857 || 19–8–4 || 42 || 
|- style="background:#cfc;"
| 32 || December 31 || @ Tampa Bay || 4–3 || SO || Shesterkin || Amalie Arena || 19,092 || 20–8–4 || 44 || 
|-

|- style="background:#cfc;"
| 33 || January 2 || Tampa Bay || 4–0 || || Shesterkin || Madison Square Garden || 16,885 || 21–8–4 || 46 || 
|- style="background:#cfc;"
| 34 || January 3 || Edmonton || 4–1 || || Georgiev || Madison Square Garden || 16,979 || 22–8–4 || 48 || 
|- style="background:#fcc;"
| 35 || January 6 || @ Vegas || 1–5 || || Georgiev || T-Mobile Arena || 18,117 || 22–9–4 || 48 || 
|- style="background:#cfc;"
| 36 || January 8 || @ Anaheim || 4–1 || || Georgiev || Honda Center || 15,146 || 23–9–4 || 50 || 
|- style="background:#fcc;"
| 37 || January 10 || @ Los Angeles || 1–3 || || Georgiev || Crypto.com Arena || 13,558 || 23–10–4 || 50 || 
|- style="background:#cfc;"
| 38 || January 13 || @ San Jose || 3–0 || || Shesterkin || SAP Center || 10,919 || 24–10–4 || 52 || 
|- style="background:#cfc;"
| 39 || January 15 || @ Philadelphia || 3–2 || || Shesterkin || Wells Fargo Center || 18,293 || 25–10–4 || 54 || 
|- style="background:#cfc;"
| 40 || January 19 || Toronto || 6–3 || || Shesterkin || Madison Square Garden || 16,624 || 26–10–4 || 56 || 
|- style="background:#fcc;"
| 41 || January 21 || @ Carolina || 3–6 || || Georgiev || PNC Arena || 16,118 || 26–11–4 || 56 || 
|- style="background:#cfc;"
| 42 || January 22 || Arizona || 7–3 || || Shesterkin || Madison Square Garden || 17,006 || 27–11–4 || 58 || 
|- style="background:#cfc;"
| 43 || January 24 || Los Angeles || 3–2 || SO || Shesterkin || Madison Square Garden || 15,666 || 28–11–4 || 60 || 
|- style="background:#fcc;"
| 44 || January 27 || @ Columbus || 3–5 || || Georgiev || Nationwide Arena || 14,878 || 28–12–4 || 60 || 
|- style="background:#fcc;"
| 45 || January 28 || Minnesota || 2–3 || || Shesterkin || Madison Square Garden || 18,006 || 28–13–4 || 60 || 
|- style="background:#cfc;"
| 46 || January 30 || Seattle || 3–2 || || Shesterkin || Madison Square Garden || 18,006 || 29–13–4 || 62 || 
|-

|- style="background:#cfc;"
| 47 || February 1 || Florida || 5–2 || || Shesterkin || Madison Square Garden || 15,942 || 30–13–4 || 64 || 
|- style="background:#cfc;"
| 48 || February 15 || Boston || 2–1 || SO || Shesterkin || Madison Square Garden || 15,403 || 31–13–4 || 66 || 
|- style="background:#fff;"
| 49 || February 17 || Detroit || 2–3 || SO || Shesterkin || Madison Square Garden || 16,461 || 31–13–5 || 67 || 
|- style="background:#cfc;"
| 50 || February 20 || @ Ottawa || 2–1 || || Shesterkin || Canadian Tire Centre || 5,181 || 32–13–5 || 69 || 
|- style="background:#cfc;"
| 51 || February 24 || Washington || 4–1 || || Shesterkin || Madison Square Garden || 18,006 || 33–13–5 || 71 || 
|- style="background:#fcc;"
| 52 || February 26 || @ Pittsburgh || 0–1 || || Shesterkin || PPG Paints Arena || 18,413 || 33–14–5 || 71 || 
|- style="background:#fcc;"
| 53 || February 27 || Vancouver || 2–5 || || Georgiev || Madison Square Garden || 16,483 || 33–15–5 || 71 || 
|-

|- style="background:#cfc;"
| 54 || March 2 || St. Louis || 5–3 || || Shesterkin || Madison Square Garden || 16,870 || 34–15–5 || 73 || 
|- style="background:#cfc;"
| 55 || March 4 || New Jersey || 3–1 || || Shesterkin || Madison Square Garden || 18,006 || 35–15–5 || 75 || 
|- style="background:#cfc;"
| 56 || March 6 || @ Winnipeg || 4–1 || || Shesterkin || Canada Life Centre || 12,867 || 36–15–5 || 77 || 
|- style="background:#fcc;"
| 57 || March 8 || @ Minnesota || 2–5 || || Georgiev || Xcel Energy Center || 18,356 || 36–16–5 || 77 || 
|- style="background:#fcc;"
| 58 || March 10 || @ St. Louis || 2–6 || || Shesterkin || Enterprise Center || 18,096 || 36–17–5 || 77 || 
|- style="background:#cfc;"
| 59 || March 12 || @ Dallas || 7–4 || || Shesterkin || American Airlines Center || 18,532 || 37–17–5 || 79 || 
|- style="background:#cfc;"
| 60 || March 15 || Anaheim || 4–3 || OT || Georgiev || Madison Square Garden || 18,006 || 38–17–5 || 81 || 
|- style="background:#fcc;"
| 61 || March 17 || NY Islanders || 1–2 || || Shesterkin || Madison Square Garden || 18,006 || 38–18–5 || 81 || 
|- style="background:#cfc;"
| 62 || March 19 || @ Tampa Bay || 2–1 || || Shesterkin || Amalie Arena || 19,092 || 39–18–5 || 83 || 
|- style="background:#cfc;"
| 63 || March 20 || @ Carolina || 2–0 || || Georgiev || PNC Arena || 18,680 || 40–18–5 || 85 || 
|- style="background:#fcc;"
| 64 || March 22 || @ New Jersey || 4–7 || || Shesterkin || Prudential Center || 16,514 || 40–19–5 || 85 || 
|- style="background:#cfc;"
| 65 || March 25 || Pittsburgh || 5–1 || || Shesterkin || Madison Square Garden || 18,006 || 41–19–5 || 87 || 
|- style="background:#cfc;"
| 66 || March 27 || Buffalo || 5–4 || OT || Georgiev || Madison Square Garden || 18,006 || 42–19–5 || 89 || 
|- style="background:#cfc;"
| 67 || March 29 || @ Pittsburgh || 3–2 || || Shesterkin || PPG Paints Arena || 18,011 || 43–19–5 || 91 || 
|- style="background:#cfc;"
| 68 || March 30 || @ Detroit || 5–4 || OT || Georgiev || Little Caesars Arena || 16,375 || 44–19–5 || 93 || 
|-

|- style="background:#fcc;"
| 69 || April 1 || NY Islanders || 0–3 || || Shesterkin || Madison Square Garden || 17,325 || 44–20–5 || 93 || 
|- style="background:#fff;"
| 70 || April 3 || Philadelphia || 3–4 || SO || Shesterkin || Madison Square Garden || 16,005 || 44–20–6 || 94 || 
|- style="background:#cfc;"
| 71 || April 5 || @ New Jersey || 3–1 || || Georgiev || Prudential Center || 15,020 || 45–20–6 || 96 || 
|- style="background:#cfc;"
| 72 || April 7 || Pittsburgh || 3–0 || || Shesterkin || Madison Square Garden || 16,694 || 46–20–6 || 98 || 
|- style="background:#cfc;"
| 73 || April 9 || Ottawa || 5–1 || || Shesterkin || Madison Square Garden || 18,006 || 47–20–6 || 100 || 
|- style="background:#fcc;"
| 74 || April 12 || Carolina || 2–4 || || Shesterkin || Madison Square Garden || 18,006 || 47–21–6 || 100 || 
|- style="background:#cfc;"
| 75 || April 13 || @ Philadelphia || 4–0 || || Georgiev || Wells Fargo Center || 15,967 || 48–21–6 || 102 || 
|- style="background:#cfc;"
| 76 || April 16 || Detroit || 4–0 || || Shesterkin || Madison Square Garden || 18,006 || 49–21–6 || 104 || 
|- style="background:#cfc;"
| 77 || April 19 || Winnipeg || 3–0 || || Shesterkin || Madison Square Garden || 18,006 || 50–21–6 || 106 || 
|- style="background:#cfc;"
| 78 || April 21 || @ NY Islanders || 6–3 || || Georgiev || UBS Arena || 17,255 || 51–21–6 || 108 || 
|- style="background:#fcc;"
| 79 || April 23 || @ Boston || 1–3 || || Shesterkin || TD Garden || 17,850 || 51–22–6 || 108 || 
|- style="background:#fcc;"
| 80 || April 26 || Carolina || 3–4 || || Shesterkin || Madison Square Garden || 17,358 || 51–23–6 || 108 || 
|- style="background:#fcc;"
| 81 || April 27 || Montreal || 3–4 || || Georgiev || Madison Square Garden || 16,845 || 51–24–6 || 108 || 
|- style="background:#cfc;"
| 82 || April 29 || Washington || 3–2 || || Georgiev || Madison Square Garden || 17,230 || 52–24–6 || 110 || 
|-

|-
|

Playoffs

The Rangers faced the Pittsburgh Penguins in the First Round, and defeated them in seven games. In the Second Round, the Rangers faced the Carolina Hurricanes, and defeated them in seven games. In the Conference Finals, the Rangers faced the Tampa Bay Lightning, and lost in six games.

|- style="background:#fcc;"
| 1 || May 3 || Pittsburgh || 3–4 || 3OT || Shesterkin || Madison Square Garden || 18,006 || 0–1 || 
|- style="background:#cfc;"
| 2 || May 5 || Pittsburgh || 5–2 || || Shesterkin || Madison Square Garden || 18,006 || 1–1 || 
|- style="background:#fcc;"
| 3 || May 7 || @ Pittsburgh || 4–7 || || Georgiev || PPG Paints Arena || 18,385 || 1–2 || 
|- style="background:#fcc;"
| 4 || May 9 || @ Pittsburgh || 2–7 || || Shesterkin || PPG Paints Arena || 18,392 || 1–3 || 
|- style="background:#cfc;"
| 5 || May 11 || Pittsburgh || 5–3 || || Shesterkin || Madison Square Garden || 18,006 || 2–3 || 
|- style="background:#cfc;"
| 6 || May 13 || @ Pittsburgh || 5–3 || || Shesterkin || PPG Paints Arena || 18,342 || 3–3 || 
|- style="background:#cfc;"
| 7 || May 15 || Pittsburgh || 4–3 || OT || Shesterkin || Madison Square Garden || 18,006 || 4–3 || 
|-

|-

|- style="background:#fcc;"
| 1 || May 18 || @ Carolina || 1–2 || OT || Shesterkin || PNC Arena || 18,705 || 0–1 || 
|- style="background:#fcc;"
| 2 || May 20 || @ Carolina || 0–2 || || Shesterkin || PNC Arena || 19,332 || 0–2 || 
|- style="background:#cfc;"
| 3 || May 22 || Carolina || 3–1 || || Shesterkin || Madison Square Garden || 18,006 || 1–2 || 
|- style="background:#cfc;"
| 4 || May 24 || Carolina || 4–1 || || Shesterkin || Madison Square Garden || 18,006 || 2–2 || 
|- style="background:#fcc;"
| 5 || May 26 || @ Carolina || 1–3 || || Shesterkin || PNC Arena || 18,786 || 2–3 || 
|- style="background:#cfc;"
| 6 || May 28 || Carolina || 5–2 || || Shesterkin || Madison Square Garden || 18,006 || 3–3 || 
|- style="background:#cfc;"
| 7 || May 30 || @ Carolina || 6–2 || || Shesterkin || PNC Arena || 18,922 || 4–3 || 
|-

|-

|- style="background:#cfc;"
| 1 || June 1 || Tampa Bay || 6–2 || || Shesterkin || Madison Square Garden || 18,006 || 1–0 || 
|- style="background:#cfc;"
| 2 || June 3 || Tampa Bay || 3–2 || || Shesterkin || Madison Square Garden || 18,006 || 2–0 || 
|- style="background:#fcc;"
| 3 || June 5 || @ Tampa Bay || 2–3 || || Shesterkin || Amalie Arena || 19,092 || 2–1 || 
|- style="background:#fcc;"
| 4 || June 7 || @ Tampa Bay || 1–4 || || Shesterkin || Amalie Arena || 19,092 || 2–2 || 
|- style="background:#fcc;"
| 5 || June 9 || Tampa Bay || 1–3 || || Shesterkin || Madison Square Garden || 18,006 || 2–3 || 
|- style="background:#fcc;"
| 6 || June 11 || @ Tampa Bay || 1–2 || || Shesterkin || Amalie Arena || 19,092 || 2–4 || 
|-

|-
|

Player statistics
As of June 12, 2022

Skaters

Goaltenders

Awards and honors

Awards

Milestones

Records

Transactions
The Rangers have been involved in the following transactions during the 2021–22 season.

Trades

Free agents

Waivers

Contract terminations

Signings

Draft picks

Below are the New York Rangers' selections at the 2021 NHL Entry Draft, which was held on July 23 and 24, 2021, in a remote format, with teams convening via videoconferencing, and Commissioner Gary Bettman announcing selections from the NHL Network studios in Secaucus, New Jersey.

Notes:
 The Buffalo Sabres' third-round pick went to the New York Rangers as the result of a trade on July 1, 2019, that sent Jimmy Vesey to Buffalo in exchange for this pick.
 The Arizona Coyotes' third-round pick went to the New York Rangers as the result of a trade on July 24, 2021, that sent a third and sixth-round picks both in 2021 (80th and 176th overall) to the Washington Capitals in exchange for this pick.
 The Los Angeles Kings' fourth-round pick went to the New York Rangers as the result of a trade on March 27, 2021, that sent Brendan Lemieux to Los Angeles in exchange for this pick.
 The Ottawa Senators' fourth-round pick went to the New York Rangers as the result of a trade on October 7, 2019, that sent Vladislav Namestnikov to Ottawa in exchange for Nick Ebert and this pick.

References

New York Rangers seasons
New York Rangers
New York Rangers
New York Rangers
New York Rangers
2020s in Manhattan
Madison Square Garden